In formal language theory, the Büchi-Elgot-Trakhtenbrot theorem states that a language is regular if and only if it can be defined in monadic second-order logic (MSO): for every MSO formula, we can find a finite-state automaton (FSA) defining the same language, and for every FSA, we can find an MSO formula defining the same language.  The theorem is due to Julius Richard Büchi, Calvin Elgot, and Boris Trakhtenbrot.

See also
Trakhtenbrot's theorem
Courcelle's theorem

References

Formal languages
Mathematical logic